Bay Times may refer to:

 San Francisco Bay Times
 The Kent Island Bay Times